Brian Daniels may refer to:

 Brian Daniels (American football) (born 1984), American football guard
 Brian "Mitts" Daniels (born 1971), American musician, songwriter, and producer
 Brian Daniels (politician) (born 1958), Minnesota politician